Fluocortin is a corticosteroid. It is similar to fluocortolone, but with one more keto group.

References 

Corticosteroid esters
Corticosteroids
Secondary alcohols
Organofluorides
Glucocorticoids
Pregnanes
Diketones